Warty sea squirt may refer to:

 Phallusia mammillata, the White Sea-squirt
 Styela clava, The Stalked Sea Squirt
 Pyura haustor, also called the Wrinkled seapump, Wrinkled sea squirt, or Warty tunicate